Albert Lamont Brown (born May 3, 1989) formerly known as Lamont Sincere is an American mixing engineer, singer, songwriter and record producer from Brooklyn, New York. He gained credibility for his single "Huge Flirt" featuring Bagstheboss and collaborated with the Harlem native ASAP Mob member ASAP TyY for "Surrounded by Girls". He is currently under 2x Entertainment, founded by rapper Casanova. He is known for mixing records for Motown Records artist Cam Wallace and featured artist Wiz Khalifa.

Biography

Early life 
Lamont Sincere was raised in the middle of Brownsville and Crown Heights from his toddler to his teenage years. In 2008, he was featured as the artist name Sincere for his song "What I Been Waiting For" on concreteloop.com.

Singing career 
Lamont Sincere music mentor was Doug E Fresh. His music production was featured during the nominations in the 2014 Soul Train Music Awards. He released his first single "Above & Beyond" in 2015 which landed his music video to be on MTV Sincere released "Huge Flirt" featuring Bagstheboss, in 2016 premiering on Hot 97 and Hot 93.7 radio. In 2017, he released another single called "Surrounded by Girls" featuring ASAP TyY from the ASAP Mob, continuously being play on Hot 93.7 in Hartford, CT. Sincere got signed to Empire by A&R Bobby Fisher and founder & CEO Ghazi Shami. He releases a double single "Where It Came From" and "Broken". In November, he became an artist under Casanova 2x Entertainment, a partnership under Warehouse Music Group / Roc Nation.

Mixing career 

From 2015, Lamont has been best known as a singer, songwriter, record producer; however, he has mixed his song and other receiving no credit. He now considers himself as a "mix engineer".

In 2021, Lamont has established his mixing career with formal education from Full Sail University leading him to become a mix engineer for BE Audio Mixing and selected by MixedByAli to be a mix engineer under his company EngineEars. He gainEd the opportunity with the help of his manager Ethelie Evelyn to work with Shawn Barron (Vice President of Motown Records) to mix songs for Cam Wallace reaching 1 million views on Spotify for mixing Retail Remix featuring Wiz Khalifa.

Musical style and influences 

Lamont Sincere has a new age R&B and pop combined sound as a singer. He has had songs played on internet and mainstream radio. Sincere gets his influential talent from his father who was a guitar player, vocalist and musical artists such as Marvin Gaye, Raphael Saadiq, Usher, 112 and The Temptations. Being a mix engineer he has been influenced from the teachings of Dave Pensado, Jaycen Joshua, Leslie Brathwaite, Josh Gudwin and MixedByAli.

Selected discography (as a singer)

EPs

Singles

Guest appearances
ASAP TyY (featuring Lamont Sincere) – "Sunshine" (2018)
3AMParadise (featuring O'Ryan, Swang and Lamont Sincere) – Red Maserati (2018)

Production credits
Soul Train Music Awards (2014)
ASAP TyY (featuring Lamont Sincere) – "Sunshine" (2016) (co-prod Tyler Mora)

Selected discography (as mix engineer)
 Cam Wallace – "We Made It" (2021)
 Cam Wallace – "Retail (Remix) Wiz Khalifa (2021)
 Cam Wallace – "These Perfect Moments" EP (2021)

References

External links

 

Living people
1989 births
People from Brownsville, Brooklyn
Singers from New York (state)
Record producers from New York (state)
21st-century American singers
People from Crown Heights, Brooklyn